Linda Isobel Spence (born 21 July 1966) is a former Irish born Scottish international cricketer whose career for the Scottish national side spanned from 2001 to 2003. She had played 6 women's one-day internationals. 

Spence was born at Dublin in 1966.

References

External links

1966 births
Living people
Scotland women One Day International cricketers
Scottish women cricket captains
Scottish women cricketers
Sportspeople from Stirling
Irish emigrants to the United Kingdom
Irish women cricketers
Cricketers from Dublin (city)
Northumberland women cricketers